Jan Oxenberg (1950) is an American film producer, director, editor, and screenwriter. She is known for her work in lesbian feminist films and in television.

Career 
Oxenberg was born in Brooklyn, New York in 1950.

She attended Barnard College for two years where she was active in the experimental college, a collaborative, co-living, and self-directed schooling experiment between Barnard and Columbia University starting in 1968. Oxenberg transferred to California Institute of the Arts (CalArts) and initially she studied feminist art with Judy Chicago and Miriam Shapiro, but later transferring into the CalArts film school. In 1972, Oxenberg was one of the many participants in Womanhouse, the first feminist art installation and performance art (specifically within the art pieces - Three Women, Birth Trilogy, Necco Wafers).

In the 1970s she was involved with ELF (education liberation front), a traveling educational resource, carrying information and books on liberation movements, racism, ecology and more. Around 1974 she was active in producing a radio series called "Lesbian Sisters" on KPFK Los Angeles.

She has also worked as a producer and writer on Pretty Little Liars. Other credits include Nothing Sacred, Cold Case, Kidnapped, In Plain Sight, and Chicago Hope.

Since 2013, Oxenberg has been adapting James Ellroy's memoir, My Dark Places for a screenplay and film production by Myriad Pictures.

Personal life
Oxenberg is Jewish, and openly lesbian. Oxenberg has been out as a lesbian since the early portion of the second wave feminist movement. For many years she dated musician Sonia Wieder-Atherton.

Filmography

See also
 List of female film and television directors
 List of lesbian filmmakers
 List of LGBT-related films directed by women

References

External links 
 
  Jan Oxenberg at Writers Guild of America West
  Jan Oxenberg at BFI

1950 births
Living people
American film editors
American film producers
American women film directors
American women film producers
American lesbian artists
Lesbian feminists
American lesbian writers
LGBT film directors
LGBT producers
LGBT Jews
American women film editors
Film producers from New York (state)
Film directors from New York City
People from Brooklyn
Barnard College alumni
California Institute of the Arts alumni
21st-century American women writers